Lucy Reed  (January 14, 1921 – July 1, 1998) was an American jazz singer, active on the Chicago jazz scene in the 1950s. She was born in Marshfield, Wisconsin as Lucille Dollinger. In 1955, she performed with Bill Evans in New York City, and Dick Marx and Johnny Frigo in 1957. While a teenager attending Humboldt High School in St. Paul, Minnesota, she started out singing on KSTP radio with a group of four girls, earning $5 per week. Lucy met her first husband, jazz drummer Joey DeRidder while living in Iron Mountain, Michigan and she performed with his musical group, the Joey DeRidder Orchestra. They married in June, 1941 and had a son in July, 1942 but Joey was killed in action while co-piloting a B-17 over Munich, Germany on July 31, 1944.

Discography
 The Singing Reed (Fantasy, 1957)
 This Is Lucy Reed (Fantasy, 1957)
 Basic Reeding (Audiophile, 1994)

References

External links
Official site

1921 births
1998 deaths
American jazz singers
American women jazz singers
People from Marshfield, Wisconsin
Singers from Wisconsin
20th-century American singers
20th-century American women singers